Gerardo Moncada may refer to:

 Gerardo Moncada (cyclist) (born 1962), Colombian road cyclist
 Gerardo Moncada (footballer) (born 1949), Colombian former footballer